The Triangle of Doom is an anatomical triangle defined by the vas deferens medially, spermatic vessels laterally and peritoneal fold inferiorly. This triangle contains external iliac artery and vein, the deep circumflex iliac vein, the genital branch of genitofemoral nerve and hidden by fascia, the femoral nerve.

It bears significance in laparoscopic repair of groin hernia. Surgical staples are avoided here.

Similar to the triangle of doom, is the Triangle of Pain, It is an Important Landmark in Laproscopic Surgery, 
The Boundaries are The Gonadal Vessels(Testicular artery and Vein)- Medially
The Iliopubic Tract- Superiorly and the Peritoneal Reflection below.
Contents of this triangle include Femoral branch of Genito femoral nerve, and Lateral cutaneous nerve of thigh.
Significance
After placing the Mesh the Surgeon must avoid putting tacks to secure the mesh Below the Iliopubic tract, or it can injure the Nerves.
Hence the name Triangle of Pain.

References

External links
 YouTube video

Lower limb anatomy
Abdomen